This list is of the Intangible Cultural Properties of Japan in the Prefecture of Nara.

National Cultural Properties
As of 1 November 2015, two Important Intangible Cultural Properties have been designated.

Performing Arts

Prefectural Cultural Properties
As of 1 May 2015, three properties have been designated at a prefectural level.

Craft Techniques

Municipal Cultural Properties
As of 1 May 2015, two properties have been designated at a municipal level.

Performing Arts

References

External links
  Cultural Properties in Nara Prefecture

Culture in Nara Prefecture
Nara